The Roman Catholic Diocese of Enugu is a diocese located in the city of Enugu in the Ecclesiastical province of Onitsha in Nigeria.

History
On November 12, 1962, the Diocese of Enugu was erected from ecclesiastical territory gained from the Metropolitan Archdiocese of Onitsha. On July 8, 2005 Enugu lost territory to the new Diocese of Awgu.

Special churches
The Cathedral is Holy Ghost Cathedral in Enugu.

Bishops
 Bishops of Enugu (Roman rite):
 Bishop John of the Cross Anyogu (1962.11.12 – 1967.07.05)
 Bishop Godfrey Okoye, C.S.Sp. (1970.03.07 – 1977.03.17)
 Bishop Michael Ugwu Eneja (1977.11.10 – 1996.11.08)
 Bishop Anthony Okonkwo Gbuji (1996.11.08 - 2009-09-05)
 Bishop Callistus Valentine Onaga

Auxiliary Bishop
Ernest Anaezichukwu Obodo (2018-)

Other priests of this diocese who became bishops
Francis Emmanuel Ogbonna Okobo, appointed Bishop of Nsukka in 1990
John Ifeanyichukwu Okoye, appointed Bishop of Awgu in 2005
Godfrey Igwebuike Onah (priest here, 1984-1990), appointed Bishop of Nsukka in 2013

See also
Bishop Anyogu, John Cross

References

Sources
 Official website of the Diocese of Enugu
 GCatholic.org Information
 The Hierarchy of the Catholic Church www.catholic-hierarchy.org Retrieved 2010-04-24.

External links
 Catholic Diocese of Enugu www.catholicdioceseenugu.org Retrieved 2010-04-24.

Roman Catholic dioceses in Nigeria
Christian organizations established in 1962
Roman Catholic dioceses and prelatures established in the 20th century
1962 establishments in Nigeria
Roman Catholic Ecclesiastical Province of Onitsha